Olearia teretifolia, commonly known as cypress daisy-bush, is a species of flowering plant in the family Asteraceae and is endemic to south-eastern continental Australia. It is a slender, erect to spreading shrub with more or less sessile, linear leaves pressed against the stem, and white and yellow, daisy-like inflorescences.

Description

Taxonomy
This daisy was first formally described in 1853 by Otto Wilhelm Sonder who gave it the name Eurybia tertifolia in the journal Linnaea, based on plant material collected from the Mount Lofty Ranges. It was renamed firstly as Aster teretifolius in 1865 by Victorian Government Botanist Ferdinand von Mueller in Fragmenta Phytographiae Australiae and finally in 1867 by George Bentham as Olearia teretifolia in Flora Australiensis. The specific epithet (teretifolia) means "terete-leaved".

Distribution and habitat
Olearia teretifolia grows in forest, mallee and scrub in disjunct areas of Victoria and in the south-east of South Australia.

References

Asterales of Australia
teretifolia
Flora of South Australia
Flora of Victoria (Australia)
Taxa named by Otto Wilhelm Sonder
Plants described in 1853